James Cowie may refer to:

 James Cowie (artist) (1886–1956), Scottish painter and artist
 Jimmy Cowie (James G. Cowie, died 1966), Scottish footballer
 James Cowie (Australian settler) (1809–1892), mayor of Geelong and Victorian colonial politician

See also
 Cowie (surname)
 Cowie (disambiguation)